The 2018 William Hill World Darts Championship was a darts event, held between 14 December 2017 and 1 January 2018 at the Alexandra Palace in London, United Kingdom. It was the 25th World Championship organised by the Professional Darts Corporation since it separated from the British Darts Organisation.

Michael van Gerwen was the defending champion, but lost 6–5 in sets to Rob Cross in the semi-finals, with the score at 5–5 in sets and with van Gerwen leading 5–4 in legs he missed 5 match darts to beat Cross. Cross forced an 11th and sudden death leg, van Gerwen missed a 6th match dart before Cross hit double 8 to win an epic semi-final and reach his first world final. Cross went on to win the World Championship on his debut by defeating Phil Taylor 7–2 in the final. Cross only turned professional 11 months prior to the event. This was Taylor's 29th and final World Championship, surpassing the record of 28 appearances he jointly held with John Lowe.

Jamie Lewis became the first player to reach the semi-finals after entering the championship through a preliminary round event, first introduced at the 2004 Championship. Lewis eventually fell to Taylor in the semi-final, by a score of 6–1.

Prize money
The prize money for the tournament was a record high of £1,800,000 in total. The winner's prize money has increased from £350,000 to £400,000.

Qualification

Qualifiers

Order of Merit

Pro Tour
  Richard North
  Vincent van der Voort
  Christian Kist
  Ronny Huybrechts
  Jermaine Wattimena
  Steve West
  Zoran Lerchbacher
 
  Jan Dekker
  Keegan Brown
  James Richardson
  Peter Jacques
  Martin Schindler
  Chris Dobey
  Steve Lennon
  Kevin Painter

PDPA Qualifier
First round Qualifier
  Ted Evetts
Preliminary round Qualifiers
  Brendan Dolan
  Jamie Lewis

International Qualifiers (Alphabetical order)
First round Qualifiers
  Toni Alcinas
  Marko Kantele
  William O'Connor
  Devon Petersen
  Diogo Portela
  Krzysztof Ratajski
  Kim Viljanen

Preliminary round Qualifiers
  Seigo Asada
  Willard Bruguier
  Cody Harris
  Luke Humphries
  Kai Fan Leung
  Paul Lim
  Alan Ljubić
  Gordon Mathers
  Kevin Münch
  Kenny Neyens
 
  Bernie Smith
  Jeff Smith
  Xiaochen Zong

Background

72 players competed in the championship; with the 32 highest ranked players on the PDC Order of Merit being seeded, and the next sixteen highest ranked players from the 2017 PDC Pro Tour Order of Merit and the top eight ranked players from a number of international and invitational qualifiers also going straight into the first round. The remaining sixteen international and invitational qualifiers competed in a preliminary round.

Michael van Gerwen, the winner of the 2014 and 2017 championships, was top of the two-year PDC Order of Merit and number one seed going into the tournament. The tournament was to be the last for Phil Taylor, who had won the PDC World Championship fourteen times previously, most recently in 2013. As well as van Gerwen and Taylor, three other previous PDC world champions qualified as seeds, two-time champions Gary Anderson and Adrian Lewis, and 2007 champion Raymond van Barneveld.

The top seeds below van Gerwen were 2017 UK Open winner Peter Wright, Gary Anderson, 2017 World Grand Prix winner Daryl Gurney and 2017 Champions League of Darts winner Mensur Suljović. Rob Cross, the runner-up at the 2017 European Championship, made his World Championship debut as the 20th seed.

Richard North, in his debut year, was the highest ranked non-seed on the 2017 PDC Pro Tour Order of Merit. As well as North, three other qualifiers through the Pro Tour made their debut, Peter Jacques, Steve Lennon and Martin Schindler. The list of qualifiers also included the 2017 Youth Champion Dimitri Van den Bergh and the 2004 runner-up Kevin Painter.

Amongst the international and invitational qualification tournaments there was, for the first time, a South and Central American Qualifier. The majority of tournaments were the same as had been for the previous championship, but there was no longer a Philippines Championship. Gordon Mathers was the first player to qualify for the Championships, having finished top of the Dartplayers Australia rankings. The top two players on the Nordic & Baltic rankings also qualified, as did the winners of the fifteen international qualifiers, including the 2017 PDC World Youth Championship.

The final four qualification places were announced on 19 October, with places being given to the highest ranked Eastern European, Krzysztof Ratajski, the National Darts Federation of Canada number one Jeff Smith, the highest ranked African, Devon Petersen, and the then-undetermined 2017 Development Tour winner, Luke Humphries. The sudden announcement of these places, and the granting of them to Ratajski, who had declined an invitation to the rival 2018 BDO World Darts Championship before failing to qualify through the 2017 PDC Pro Tour Order of Merit; and Jeff Smith, who had failed to qualify for the BDO World Darts Championship and not played a single PDC event in the previous year, were criticized by some, with ITV4 pundit and tour card holder Paul Nicholson saying he had written to the Professional Darts Players Association to seek clarification over the placings.

The final three placings were determined by the PDPA qualifier held at Arena MK on 27 November, with Ted Evetts securing a first round place by winning the tournament, and runner-up Brendan Dolan and third-place playoff winner Jamie Lewis both qualifying to the preliminary round. The third place had become available as the 2017 PDC World Youth Championship, which carries a qualification place, was won by Dimitri Van den Bergh, who qualified through the Pro Tour Order of Merit.

15 of the international and invitational qualifiers were making their PDC World Championship debuts, Seigo Asada, Willard Bruguier, Ted Evetts, Cody Harris, Luke Humphries, Kai Fan Leung, Alan Ljubić, Gordon Mathers, Kenny Neyens, William O'Connor, Diogo Portela, Krzysztof Ratajski, Bernie Smith, Jeff Smith, and Zong Xiao Chen. Portela was the first ever Brazilian to qualify for the World Championships.

Summary

The top quarter of the draw saw reigning champion Michael van Gerwen dominate, knocking fellow Dutchman Christian Kist out in the first round, before defeating James Wilson, without losing any of the twelve legs played, and Gerwyn Price, to set up a quarter-final with fellow Dutch former world champion Raymond van Barneveld. In the quarter-final, van Gerwen took an early lead, but missed a dart in the fifth set to take a 4–1 lead and ended up being pulled back to 3–3. The two took one more set each before van Gerwen won the deciding set 3–1 to qualify for the semi-final.

In the second quarter, the fourth seed, Daryl Gurney, was eliminated in the second round by John Henderson. Debutant Rob Cross defeated Michael Smith in the second round after Smith missed two match darts, and Cross went on to defeat Henderson to set up a quarter-final against the World Youth Champion Dimitri Van den Bergh, who had defeated fifth seed Mensur Suljović in the third round. In the quarter-final, Cross led his Belgian opponent early on, leading 4–1 in the best-of-nine match after five sets. Van den Bergh took the next three sets in succession, setting up a decider which Cross won 3–1, hitting double one in the final leg to qualify for the semi-final.

The two highest-ranked seeds in the third quarter fell early on. Two-time champion and seventh seed Adrian Lewis was knocked out in the first round by German qualifier Kevin Münch, while the second seed Peter Wright was knocked out in the second round by Jamie Lewis, who had qualified for the event by coming third in the final PDPA Qualifier. Welshman Jamie Lewis went past the unseeded James Richardson in the third round, becoming the first player to go from the preliminary round to the quarter-final in the history of the championship; before whitewashing Darren Webster to reach the semi-final.

Two former world champions, two-time champion Gary Anderson and retiring sixteen-time champion Phil Taylor, met in the last quarter-final. Anderson's run to the quarter-final included a second round win over 63-year-old Singaporean, Paul Lim, a match noted for a leg in which Lim, who in 1990 had become the first player to throw a perfect nine-dart leg in the World Darts Championship, missed a dart at double twelve to repeat the feat. Taylor had faced English opposition in his three previous rounds, beating Chris Dobey in the first round before whitewashing Justin Pipe and Keegan Brown in the next two rounds to set up the quarter-final. Taylor took a 4–1 lead after winning six consecutive  legs, and despite Anderson winning the next two sets, Taylor took advantage of missed darts in the eighth set to triumph, 5–3.

The semi-final between Taylor and Lewis was the first to be played, and, despite Lewis winning the first set, Taylor took the next three, with Lewis having missed darts in all three sets to have potentially been 4–0 up. Taylor won the next two sets as well, before Lewis took the first two legs in the seventh set, with Taylor taking advantage of three missed set darts from Lewis to steal the set and qualify for the twenty-first World Darts Championship final in his career.

In the second semi-final, debutant Cross took on reigning world champion van Gerwen. The first eight sets in the match all went with throw, with Cross taking a lead before being pegged back by van Gerwen. Michael van Gerwen got the first break in the ninth set, taking a 5–4 lead to throw for the match, but Cross fought back to win the tenth set 3–1 to force a deciding set. In the deciding set – which had to be won by two clear legs until the eleventh leg was reached – Cross missed a match-winning dart at the bull with the score at 3–2, before van Gerwen won two legs in succession to take a 5–4 lead. With both players under pressure, van Gerwen missed five darts to win the tenth leg, before Cross hit a double 18 to force a sudden death leg. Both Cross and van Gerwen missed match darts at double 16 before Cross hit double 8 to qualify for the final in his debut entry, becoming the first player to make the final on his debut since Kirk Shepherd in 2008.

In the final, held on New Year's Day 2018, Phil Taylor won the bull-off, but opted to allow Cross to throw first. Rob Cross held the first set 3–1, and broke in the second set by the same scoreline, before winning the third set 3–0. Taylor scored his first set with a 3–0 win in the fourth, before missing a dart at double twelve for a potential perfect nine-dart leg in the first leg of the fifth set.	
Cross won that leg and the next two to restore his three set lead, before breaking Taylor in the first leg of the sixth set, and the fourth leg of the seventh, taking a 6–1 lead in the best-of-thirteen match.	
Taylor held the eighth set 3–0, but Cross held the first leg in the ninth set, before hitting double-eight to break and go one leg away from the championship, and in the final leg, hit a 140 finish, treble-18, treble-18, double-16 to win the world championship.

Preliminary round
The draw was made on 26 November 2017.

Best of three sets.

Main draw
The draw for the main round was made live on Sky Sports News on 27 November 2017.

Final

Statistics

Top averages
This table shows the highest averages achieved by players throughout the tournament.

Representation from different countries
This table shows the number of players by country in the World Championship, the total number including the preliminary round. Twenty-four countries were represented in the World Championship, two more than in the previous championship.

Media coverage 
The tournament was available in the following countries on these channels:

Additionally, there was coverage in Andorra, Armenia, Azerbaijan, Belarus, Estonia, France, Georgia, Israel, Kazakhstan, Kyrgyzstan, Latvia, Moldova, Monaco, Portugal, Romania, Russia, Spain, Tajikistan, Turkey, Turkmenistan, Ukraine and Uzbekistan on Eurosport Player, and coverage in all countries except the UK, Ireland and the Netherlands on the Professional Darts Corporation's streaming service, PDCTV-HD.

† Sky Sports Arena was renamed as Sky Sports Darts for the duration of the tournament.

References

External links
Official website
Results and Schedule

2018
World Championship
World Championship
2017 sports events in London
2018 sports events in London
2017 in British sport
2018 in British sport
International sports competitions in London
Alexandra Palace
December 2017 sports events in the United Kingdom
PDC World Darts